West Wind Aviation Limited Partnership was a Saskatchewan based airline.

Destinations 

Under its ExpressAir banner, West Wind formerly offered scheduled service between Regina, Saskatoon and Prince Albert. Service in northern Saskatchewan and Nunavut were provided under the Pronto Airways banner. In 2015 West Wind Aviation absorbed Osprey Wings which was established in 1979.

Its main commercial rival was Prince Albert-based Transwest Air which became a subsidiary of West Wind Aviation July 1, 2016, and all scheduled flights are operated by Transwest.

In January 2021, it was announced West Wind Aviation will be merged with Transwest Air and renamed Rise Air.

Fleet 
As of February 2020, West Wind Aviation had the following aircraft registered with Transport Canada.

In addition the Transport Canada site lists a Cessna 414 and three Cessna 401s (one Cessna 401 and two Cessna 401B) with cancelled certificates.

Aviation services 

West Wind operates fixed-base operations at the Saskatoon and Regina airports under Shell Canada's AeroCentre franchise.  Under the International Air Services brand, West Wind provides airport terminal services to charter and international airlines at the Saskatoon, Regina and Winnipeg airports.  In addition, under the Lancaster Fuel brand, the company provides aviation fuel to smaller airports and private operators in the province.

Accidents 
 West Wind Aviation Flight 280, an ATR42 aircraft crashed with 22 passengers and 3 crew on board at Fond-du-Lac, approximately 1 km from the airport, immediately after taking off from the airport, on December 13, 2017. The aircraft was destroyed but everyone on board initially survived, 1 passenger died of his injuries 12 days later.

Repercussions 
On December 22, 2017, West Wind Aviation's air operator certificate was suspended by Transport Canada. Transport Canada cited the reason in a news release stating that the airline has deficiencies in its safety management system. Transport Canada also mentioned that the airline lost its Operator Certificate in the interest of public safety. "In the interest of public safety, Transport Canada suspended West Wind Aviation's Air Operator Certificate and will not allow the company to resume its commercial air service until it demonstrates compliance with aviation safety regulations".

Transport Canada reinstated West Wind's license to operate on May 8, 2018. Operations have since resumed.

References

External links 

West Wind Aviation official site
Express Air

Defunct airlines of Canada
Airlines established in 1983
Airlines disestablished in 2021
Regional airlines of Saskatchewan
Charter airlines of Canada
Companies based in Saskatoon
Canadian companies established in 1983
1983 establishments in Saskatchewan